Amber Campbell (born June 5, 1981) is an American hammer thrower. Campbell attended Coastal Carolina University in South Carolina and competed for  the Chanticleer track team. She had her first international competition at the 2005 World Championships. She then competed in the 2009, 2011, 2013, and 2015 World Championships. Her first Olympic birth came at the 2008 Olympic Games in Beijing, China. She then went on to compete at the 2012 Olympic Games as well. At the 2016 Summer Olympics in Brazil, Campbell advanced to the finals placing 6th finishing as the highest placing American woman ever.

Her personal best is 74.03 m (242 ft 10 in), which was her winning mark at the 2016 United States Olympic Trials in Eugene.  The mark is the former W35 Masters World Record.

International competitions

References

External links

Amber Campbell Athletics profile

1981 births
Living people
Track and field athletes from Cincinnati
Track and field athletes from Indianapolis
American female hammer throwers
Female weight throwers
African-American female track and field athletes
Olympic track and field athletes of the United States
Athletes (track and field) at the 2008 Summer Olympics
Athletes (track and field) at the 2012 Summer Olympics
Athletes (track and field) at the 2016 Summer Olympics
Pan American Games silver medalists for the United States
Pan American Games bronze medalists for the United States
Pan American Games medalists in athletics (track and field)
Athletes (track and field) at the 2011 Pan American Games
Athletes (track and field) at the 2015 Pan American Games
World Athletics Championships athletes for the United States
Coastal Carolina Chanticleers women's track and field athletes
USA Outdoor Track and Field Championships winners
USA Indoor Track and Field Championships winners
Medalists at the 2011 Pan American Games
Medalists at the 2015 Pan American Games
21st-century African-American sportspeople
21st-century African-American women
20th-century African-American people
20th-century African-American women